Events in the year 1857 in Norway.

Incumbents
Monarch: Oscar I

Events
6 June – Sophia of Nassau marries the future King Oscar II of Sweden-Norway

Births

4 January – John N. Kildahl, Norwegian-American Lutheran church minister, author and educator (died 1920)
15 March – Christian Michelsen, shipping magnate, politician and Prime Minister of Norway (died 1925)
27 April – Theodor Kittelsen, artist (died 1914)
8 May – Agnes Mathilde Wergeland, Norwegian-American historian and poet (died 1914)
2 June – Urban Jacob Rasmus Børresen, rear admiral (died 1943)
28 July – Andreas Thidemand Carlsen Ruud, politician
19 August – Haldor Børve, architect (died 1933).
21 October- Frederick William Cappelen, Norwegian American architect and civil engineer (died 1921)
10 November – Aad J. Vinje,  Chief Justice of the Wisconsin Supreme Court (died 1929)
18 November – Gunnar Heiberg, playwright (died 1929)

Full date unknown
Waldemar Hansteen, architect (died 1921)
Johan Peter Jacobson, politician

Deaths
16 April - Ferdinand Carl Maria Wedel-Jarlsberg, commanding general of the Norwegian Army (born 1781)
11 June - Jens Rynning, priest (born 1778)
14 October – Johan Christian Dahl, painter (born 1788)
28 October – Hother Erich Werner Bøttger, politician (born 1801)

Full date unknown
Diderik Bøgvad, politician (born 1792)

See also

References